Craig Dean Levie (born August 17, 1959) is a Canadian former professional ice hockey defenceman who played 183 games in the National Hockey League for the St. Louis Blues, Minnesota North Stars, Winnipeg Jets, and Vancouver Canucks.

Career statistics

Awards
 WHL Second All-Star Team – 1979

External links

1959 births
Living people
Calgary Centennials players
Canadian expatriate ice hockey players in Switzerland
Canadian ice hockey defencemen
Edmonton Oil Kings (WCHL) players
Flin Flon Bombers players
Fort Wayne Komets players
HC Davos players
HC Milano players
Minnesota North Stars players
Montreal Canadiens draft picks
Nova Scotia Voyageurs players
Pincher Creek Panthers players
Salt Lake Golden Eagles (CHL) players
Sherbrooke Jets players
Ice hockey people from Calgary
Springfield Indians players
St. Louis Blues players
Tulsa Oilers (1964–1984) players
Vancouver Canucks players
Winnipeg Jets (1979–1996) players